The Breve diccionario etimológico de la lengua castellana (in English, Brief etymological dictionary of the Spanish language) is an etymological dictionary compiled by the Catalan philologist Joan Corominas (1905–1997), and first published in 1961—with revised editions in 1973, 1993, and 2008—by Gredos in Madrid.

This work has received high marks from critics in the field of Romance philology, and its author has been recognized with the highest honors of Spanish civil society, such as the Premio Nacional de las Letras Españolas, in 1989, which was for the entirety of his work, including both Spanish and Catalan dictionaries.

Context 
The dictionary is an abridged version, updated with additional entries, of the Diccionario crítico etimológico de la lengua castellana, and is intended for the non-specialist. It gives the origins of Spanish vocabulary, with frequent references to the rest of the languages of the Iberian Peninsula, as well as to Latin.

See also 
 Joan Corominas
 Diccionario crítico etimológico de la lengua castellana
 Diccionario crítico etimológico castellano e hispánico
 Diccionari Etimològic i Complementari de la Llengua Catalana

References

Bibliography

External links 
 The Corominas

Spanish language
Etymological dictionaries